Peltogasterella sulcata is a species of parasitic barnacle in the family Peltogasterellidae.

References

External links

 

Barnacles